Sobral Peninsula is a high and mainly ice-covered peninsula projecting from Nordenskjöld Coast in northern Graham Land, Antarctica. The feature is 11 nautical miles (20 km) long and 5 nautical miles (9 km) wide and projects southward between Larsen Inlet to the east and Mundraga Bay to the west. The name was applied by United Kingdom Antarctic Place-Names Committee (UK-APC) (1963) and derives from Cape Sobral at the south end of this peninsula.

References
 SCAR Composite Antarctic Gazetteer.

External links
 Sobral Peninsula. Copernix satellite image

Peninsulas of Graham Land
Nordenskjöld Coast